Belgium–Kosovo relations refer to the bilateral relations of the Kingdom of Belgium and the Republic of Kosovo. Kosovo has an embassy in Brussels and Belgium has a Liaison Office in Pristina.

Belgium was one of the first countries to recognise Kosovo's independence on 24 February 2008. As a European Union (EU) founder and member, Belgium supports Kosovo in its euro-integration path.

Military 

Belgium participated in the 1999 NATO bombing of Yugoslavia, which resulted in a UN administration of Kosovo and then to eventual independence. Belgium currently has 205 troops serving in Kosovo as peacekeepers in the NATO led Kosovo Force.

See also 
 Foreign relations of Belgium
 Foreign relations of Kosovo
 Belgium–Serbia relations

Notes

References  

 
Bilateral relations of Kosovo
Kosovo